Chloë Levine is an American actress and filmmaker from New York City. Levine has appeared in as well as directed numerous films, both short and feature-length. Her most notable appearances include Innocence (2013), The Transfiguration (2016), The Defenders (2017),  The Ranger (2018), Antarctica (2020), and on television in The OA (2016-2019), and Trinkets in 2020. Levine is a filmmaker as well. Among other accolades, she notably received the award for Best Experimental Short at Tribeca film institute in 2014 for her short film Dragon.

Personal life and career

Levine is a New York City native. In 2014, a short film directed by Levine, Dragon, won Best Experimental Short at Tribeca film institute. She starred as Sunday Wilson in the  Hilary Brougher directed thriller Innocence in 2013. 

In 2017, Levine appeared as Lexi in the Marvel Studios miniseries  The Defenders in a cast which included Krysten Ritter and Sigourney Weaver. In 2018, she starred as Chelsea in the punk inspired slasher film, The Ranger The same year, she was cast as the protagonist in the film Savage Youth.

Filmography

Film

Television

References

External links

Living people
1996 births
21st-century American women
American film actresses
American television actresses
People from New York City